Frank Russell may refer to:

Frank Russell, Baron Russell of Killowen (1867–1946), British Lord of Appeal in Ordinary
Frank Russell, 2nd Earl Russell (1865–1931), British politician and brother of Bertrand Russell
Ted Malone (1908–1989), ne Frank Russell, American radio broadcaster
Frank Henry Russell (1878–1947), American aviation pioneer 
Frank Russell (anthropologist) (1868–1903)
Frank Russell (baseball) (1921–1984), American Negro leagues baseball player
Frank Russell (bassist), American jazz bassist
Frank Russell (basketball) (born 1949), American basketball player
Frank Ford Russell (1904–1969), American wrestler

See also
Russell Investment Group, aka Frank Russell Company, US investment services company 
Francis Russell (disambiguation)